is a song by Japanese singer-songwriter Miliyah Kato from her second compilation album M Best (2011) and her sixth studio album True Lovers (2012). The song was written by Kato herself, while the production was done by Kato's frequent collaborator, Yuichiro Goto. The single was released for the two versions of CD and digital download on 16 March 2011 through Mastersix Foundation as the lead single from M Best. Ahead of its official release, the short version of the song was released on 2 March 2011 as a ringtone.

"Yūsha Tachi" is a middle-tempo J-pop track with the elements of R&B. The single peaked at number 13 on the Billboard Japan Hot 100 and reached number eight on the Oricon Weekly Singles Chart. "Yūsha Tachi" has been certified gold by the Recording Industry Association of Japan with more than 100,000 units downloaded. The song served as the theme songs to the Japanese television shows, Happy Music and Dance@TV. Kato provided the first televised performance on Bokura no Ongaku on 29 July 2011, for the promotion of the song was put into a halt due to the impact of the 2011 Tōhoku earthquake and tsunami. The accompanying music video was directed by Tomoo Noda and included on the DVD accompanying with the limited edition of the single. In June 2012, the video won the 2012 MTV Video Music Awards Japan for the Best R&B Video. The song has also received several official remixes.

Commercial performance
In Japan, "Yūsha Tachi" debuted at its peak, number 13 on the Billboard Japan Hot 100 dated 23 March 2011. On the Oricon Weekly Singles Chart, the single debuted at number eight with the sales of 6,178 copies. It stayed on the chart for six weeks, selling over 11,000 copies in total. 
"Yūsha Tachi" scored a moderate success on the adult contemporary radio, peaking at number 21 on the Billboard Japan Adult Contemporary Airplay chart. In June 2012, "Yūsha Tachi" was certified gold by the Recording Industry Association of Japan with more than 100,000 units downloaded.

Other versions

Remixes
Two remixes of "Yūsha Tachi" have been officially released as of January 2021. The first remix was by T.O.M., and released on 6 June 2012 as the B-side track of Kato's single "Aiaiai". A remix by Manaboon, known as Sleepless Night Manaboon Remix, was released as the B-side track of Kato's single "Honto no Boku wo Shitte" on 4 September 2019.

Cover version
"Yūsha Tachi" was covered by Japanese-American singer Ai for Kato's tribute album, Inspire (2020). Ai is Kato's fellow musician and has collaborated with the singer for their single, "Stronger" (2011). The album peaked at number 40 on the Billboard Japan Hot Albums chart as well as reaching number 43 on the Oricon Weekly Albums chart.

Track listing

Charts

Weekly charts

Year-end charts

Certification and sales

|-
! scope="row"| Japan (RIAJ)
| Gold
| 100,000 
|-
! scope="row"| Japan (RIAJ)
| 
| 7,009 
|-
|}

Release history

References

2011 singles
2011 songs
J-pop songs
Miliyah Kato songs
Mastersix Foundation singles
Ai (singer) songs
EMI Records singles
2020 singles
2020 songs